Awards and nominations for awards for the rock band Keane are indicated in this article. Keane is a British rock band formed in Battle, East Sussex by Tim Rice-Oxley (piano, synthesisers, backing vocals), Richard Hughes (drums, percussion, backing vocals), Jesse Quin (bass guitar, acoustic/electric guitar, backing vocals) and Tom Chaplin (lead vocals, acoustic/electric guitar). They have released four studio albums—Hopes and Fears (2004), Under the Iron Sea (2006), Perfect Symmetry (2008) and Strangeland (2012).

ASCAP/PRS Awards
Keane has received one awards from one nomination.

Brit Awards
The Brit Awards are the British Phonographic Industry's annual pop music awards. Keane has received two awards from five nominations.

Echo Awards
The Echo Awards is a German music award event which is held annually, where the year's winners are decided by the band's sales from the previous year. Keane has received one award from one nomination.

GQ Awards
GQ is a monthly men's magazine, where the annual winners are voted through the GQ website. Keane has received one award from one nomination.

Grammy Awards
The Grammy Awards is an annual music awards show held by the National Academy of Recording Arts and Sciences of the United States for outstanding achievements in the record industry. Keane has received no awards from two nominations.

Ivor Novello Awards
The Ivor Novello Awards is an award ceremony for songwriting and composing, held annually in London, United Kingdom. Keane has received one award from one nominations.

Mercury Music Prize Awards
The Mercury Prize Awards is an annually held awards ceremony for the year's best albums. Keane has received no awards from one nomination.

MTV Awards

MTV Europe Music Awards
The MTV Europe Music Awards is an annual awards ceremony established in 1994 by MTV Europe for the best in European music. Keane has received no awards from three nominations.

MTVU Woody Awards
Keane has received no award from one nomination.

Premios Onda
Keane has received one award from one nomination.

Q magazine
The UK music magazine Q designated annual awards for excellence in music.

Q Awards

The Q Best of 2008

World Music Awards
The World Music Awards is an international awards ceremony that annually honors recording artists based on worldwide sales figures provided by the International Federation of the Phonographic Industry. Keane has received no awards from two nominations.

External links
 Official website

Awards
Lists of awards received by British musician
Lists of awards received by musical group